Notaeolidia depressa is a species of sea slug, an aeolid nudibranch, a marine gastropod mollusc in the family Notaeolidiidae.

Distribution
This species was described from McMurdo Bay, Ross Sea, Antarctica. It has been reported from a number of Antarctic localities at depths of 30–429 m.

References 

Notaeolidiidae
Gastropods described in 1907